Rosie  is a 1998 drama film written and directed by Patrice Toye. It was screened at the 1998 Toronto International Film Festival. It received the André Cavens Award for Best Film given by the Belgian Film Critics Association (UCC). Rosie was selected as the Belgian entry for the Best Foreign Language Film at the 71st Academy Awards, but was not nominated.

Plot 
Rosie, a teenage girl in Belgium, attempts to deal with her dysfunctional family and an adult world that she does not understand.

Cast 
 Aranka Coppens as Rosie
 Sara de Roo as Irene
 Dirk Roofthooft as Bernard
 Joost Wijnant as Jimi

Reception 
Rotten Tomatoes, a review aggregator, reports that 67% of six surveyed critics gave the film a positive review; the average rating was 6.1/10.  Glenn Lovell of Variety called it "the most incisive look at adolescent angst since Peter Jackson’s Heavenly Creatures".  Janet Maslin of The New York Times wrote that film's decision to hide plot details until the climax "adds suspense, and eventually chills, to what would otherwise be an all too familiar tale of domestic dysfunction".

See also
 List of submissions to the 71st Academy Awards for Best Foreign Language Film
 List of Belgian submissions for the Academy Award for Best Foreign Language Film

References

External links 
 

1998 films
1998 drama films
Belgian drama films
French drama films
1990s Dutch-language films
Dutch-language Belgian films
1990s French films